X Factor is an Italian television music competition to find new singing talent; the winner receives a recording contract with Sony Music. Fedez was confirmed as judge and mentor, Arisa returned, while Manuel Agnelli and Alvaro Soler were chosen to replace Skin and Elio; Alessandro Cattelan was confirmed as host. The tenth season aired on Sky Uno and TV8 starting from September 2016. Soul System became the second group to win the competition since it began.

Judges' houses
The "Home Visit" is the final phase before the Live Shows. In this phase, the contestants who passed the "Bootcamp" had to perform one last time in front of their specific judge, each in a different location. At the end of this audition, the top twelve contestants were chosen.

The twelve eliminated acts were:
Boys at Turin: Lorenzo Aleandri, Salvatore Misiano, Diego Micheli
Girls at Saint-Tropez:  Valentina Giardullo, Sofia Rollo, Grace
25+ at Bologna:  Simone Nannicini, Giovanni Diana, Veronica Marchi
Groups at Barcelona:  IISO, Soul System, Oak

Contestants and categories
Key:
 – Winner
 – Runner-up
 – Third place
 – Withdrew

Soul System replaced Jarvis who withdrew from the competition before the live shows.

Live shows

Results summary

Colour key

Live show details

Week 1 (27 October)
Celebrity performers: Marco Mengoni ("Sai che") and Matt Simons ("Light in You"/"Ad occhi chiusi")

Judges' votes to eliminate
 Soler: Diego Conti – backed his own act, Les Enfants.
 Arisa: Les Enfants – backed her own act, Diego Conti.
 Fedez: Diego Conti – said that he preferred Les Enfants.
 Agnelli: Diego Conti – said that he preferred Les Enfants.

Week 2 (3 November)

Celebrity performers: Giorgia ("Oronero")

Judges' votes to eliminate
 Soler: Caterina Cropelli – backed his own act, Les Enfants.
 Fedez: Les Enfants – backed his own act, Caterina Cropelli.
 Arisa: Les Enfants – felt more connected to Caterina.
 Agnelli: Caterina Cropelli – said that he preferred Les Enfants.

With the acts in the sing-off receiving two votes each, the result went to deadlock and a new public vote commenced for 200 seconds. Les Enfants were eliminated as the act with the fewest public votes.

Week 3 (10 November)

Theme: Generation icon
Celebrity performers: Robbie Williams ("Party Like a Russian"/"Love My Life") and Shawn Mendes ("Mercy")

Judges' votes to eliminate
 Agnelli: Loomy – backed his own act, Silva Fortes.
 Arisa: Silva Fortes – backed her own act, Loomy.
 Fedez: Silva Fortes – felt closer to Loomy and happy that there were rappers in his path like him.
 Soler: Silva Fortes – appreciated the continuous improvement of Loomy.

Week 4 (17 November)

Celebrity performers: Lorenzo Fragola ("D'improvviso")

Week 5 (24 November)

Celebrity performers: Little Mix ("Shout Out to My Ex")

Judges' votes to eliminate
 Agenlli: Caterina Cropelli  – backed his own act, Eva Pevarello
 Fedez: Eva Pevarello – backed his own act, Caterina Cropelli
 Arisa: Caterina Cropelli – stated that she had preferred Pevarello.
 Soler: Caterina Cropelli – said he did not understand why Pevarello was in the bottom two.

Week 6: Quarter-final (1 December)

Celebrity performers: Skunk Anansie & Fabio Rovazzi

Judges' votes to eliminate
 Arisa: Gaia Gozzi – backed her own act, Loomy.
 Fedez: Loomy – backed his own act, Gaia Gozzi.
 Soler: Loomy – gave no reason.
 Agnelli: Loomy – said that he wanted to hear more from Gozzi.

Week 7: Semi-final (8 December)

Judges' votes to eliminate
 Agnelli: Roshelle – backed his own act, Andrea Biagioni.
 Fedez: Andrea Biagioni – backed his own act, Roshelle.
 Arisa: Andrea Biagioni – gave no reason.
 Soler: Roshelle – could not decide so chose to take it to deadlock.

With the acts in the sing-off receiving two votes each, the result went to deadlock and reverted to the earlier public vote. Andrea Biagioni was eliminated as the act with the fewest public votes.

Week 8: Final (15 December)

References

External links
 X Factor Italia

2016 Italian television seasons
Italian music television series
Italy 10
X Factor (Italian TV series)